Wilfried Hanke (23 September 1901 – ?) was a German violinist and music educator.

Life 
Hanke came from the Bohemian city of Levín in the then Austria-Hungary.

He joined the Berlin Philharmonic orchestra in 1927 under the principal conductor Wilhelm Furtwängler. In 1932/33 he was an active member of the orchestra, finally as second concertmaster. In 1931 he was also a member of the Bayreuth Festival Orchestra, which was conducted by Furtwängler at the time. On 1 January 1934, Hanke became first concertmaster at the Hamburg State Theatre. In 1934 the Philharmonic Orchestra and the City Theatre Orchestra merged to form the Philharmonisches Staatsorchester Hamburg, where he was also concertmaster. He played with the conductors Eugen Jochum, Joseph Keilberth and Wolfgang Sawallisch.

From 1938 to 1943 he was primarius of the Hanke Quartet in Hamburg. He played with Rudolf Prick (2nd violin), Fritz Lang (viola) and Rudolf Metzmacher and Bernhard Günther (violoncello). Together with Carl Seemann (piano) and Atis Teichmannis (cello), he performed in the Seemann Trio. He was soloist among others at the premiere of Willy Czernik's Violin Concerto in A minor (with the Staatsorchester Braunschweig) and by Rudolf von Oertzen's Symphonischer Dialog for solo violins and orchestra (conducted by Wolfgang Sawallisch). Furthermore, in 1941 he conducted in Hamburg  the premiere of Helmut Paulsen's Sonata for violin and piano (with the composer).

From the 1950s he was also professor of violin at the Hochschule für Musik und Theater Hamburg.

Literature 
 Gerassimos Avgerinos: Künstler-Biographien: die Mitglieder im Berliner Philharmonischen Orchester von 1882–1972. self edited, Berlin 1972, .

References

External links 
 
 

1901 births
Date of death unknown
People from Litoměřice District
German classical violinists
20th-century classical violinists
Male classical violinists
Concertmasters
German Bohemian people
20th-century German male musicians